Don Richard Ashburn (March 19, 1927 – September 9, 1997), also known by the nicknames, "Putt-Putt", "The Tilden Flash", and "Whitey" (due to his light-blond hair), was an American center fielder in Major League Baseball. (Some sources give his full middle name as "Richie".) He was born in Tilden, Nebraska and along with his twin sister, Donna, was the youngest of four children. From his youth on a farm, he grew up to become a professional outfielder and veteran broadcaster for the Philadelphia Phillies and one of the most beloved sports figures in Philadelphia history. He was inducted into the National Baseball Hall of Fame in 1995.

Playing career
 One of the famous "Whiz Kids" of the National League champion 1950 Phillies, Ashburn spent 12 of his 15 major-league seasons as the Phillies' center fielder (1948–1959). He sported a .308 lifetime batting average, leading the National League twice, and routinely led the league in fielding percentage. 

The Phillies purchased Ashburn's contract from their Toronto Maple Leafs minor league affiliate on April 8, 1948 and he opened the season on the Phillies' major league roster. On July 13, 1948, Ashburn started the 1948 Major League Baseball All-Star Game for the National League, singling on the first pitch of the game, and scoring the first run.

In 1950, in the last game of the regular season, Ashburn threw Dodgers' runner Cal Abrams out at home plate to preserve a 1–1 tie and set the stage for Dick Sisler's pennant-clinching home run. He had been playing in to back up a pick-off throw on a pitchout, but pitcher Robin Roberts had instead thrown a fastball to the batter, Duke Snider.

The following year Ashburn displayed his fielding skill on the national stage in the All-Star Game at Tiger Stadium in Detroit. The Associated Press reported, "Richie Ashburn, fleet footed Philadelphia Phillies outfielder, brought the huge Briggs Stadium crowd of 52,075 to its feet with a brilliant leaping catch in the sixth inning to rob Vic Wertz of a near homer. Ashburn caught the ball in front of the right centerfield screen 400 feet distant after a long run." He was also the last Phillies player to collect eight hits in a double-header when he singled eight times in a twinbill at Pittsburgh on May 20, 1951.

Ashburn was a singles hitter rather than a slugger, accumulating over 2,500 hits in 15 years against only 29 home runs. In his day he was regarded as the archetypal "spray hitter", stroking the ball equally well to all fields, thus making him harder to defend against. Ashburn accumulated the most hits (1,875) of any batter during the 1950s.

During a game on August 17, 1957, Ashburn hit a foul ball into the stands that struck spectator Alice Roth, wife of Philadelphia Bulletin sports editor Earl Roth, breaking her nose. When play resumed Ashburn fouled off another ball that struck her while she was being carried off in a stretcher. Ashburn and Roth maintained a friendship for many years, and the Roths' son later served as a Phillies batboy.

Ashburn was traded to the Chicago Cubs following the 1959 season for three players.  He went on to anchor center field for the North Siders in 1960 and 1961. Anticipating a future career behind a microphone, Ashburn sometimes conducted a post-game baseball instruction clinic at Wrigley Field for the benefit of the youngsters in the WGN-TV viewing audience.

Ashburn was purchased by the expansion New York Mets for the 1962 season and was the first batter in franchise history. He had a good year offensively, batting .306, and was the team's first All-Star Game representative. It was, however, a frustrating year for the polished professional, who had begun his career with a winner and found himself playing for the least successful team in modern baseball history (with a record of 40–120). He retired at the end of the season.

One oft-told story is that on short flies to center or left-center, center fielder Ashburn would collide with shortstop Elio Chacón. Chacón, from Venezuela, spoke little English and had difficulty understanding when Ashburn was calling him off the ball. To remedy matters teammate Joe Christopher taught Ashburn to say "Yo la tengo", Spanish for "I’ve got it." When Ashburn first used this phrase it worked fine, keeping Chacón from running into him. But then left fielder Frank Thomas, who did not speak a word of Spanish, slammed into Ashburn. After getting up Thomas asked Ashburn, "What the heck is a Yellow Tango?" This anecdote inspired the name of the American indie rock group Yo La Tengo.

In his last five seasons, Ashburn played for the 8th-place Phillies, the 7th-place Cubs, and the 10th-place Mets. The infamous first-year Mets club won only a quarter of its games, and Ashburn decided to retire from active play. The last straw might have been during the Mets' 120th loss, when Ashburn was one of the three Mets victims in a triple play pulled off by his former teammates, the 9th-place Cubs. According to Jimmy Breslin, it was the prospect of sitting on the bench that led Ashburn to retire: "He sat on the bench for a while with another team once and it bothered him badly. And he said that if he ever had to be a benchwarmer for the New York Mets he'd commit suicide."

Throughout his playing career, Ashburn, who lived in his hometown of Tilden during the offseason, officiated high school basketball games throughout Nebraska as a way to stay in playing condition.  He became a well-respected official, but retired from officiating when he retired from baseball.

Post-career and death

Starting in 1963, Ashburn became a radio and TV color commentator for the Phillies, his original big-league team. He first worked with long-time Phillies announcers Bill Campbell and Byrum Saam. In 1971 Campbell was released by the Phillies and replaced by Harry Kalas. From 1971 to 1976, Ashburn worked together with Saam and Kalas who would both be Ford C. Frick Award winners. Saam retired in 1976, and Ashburn continued working with Kalas for the next two decades, the two growing to be best friends.  Kalas often referred to Ashburn as "His Whiteness", a nickname Kalas used for most of Ashburn's life for the man he openly adored.

Ashburn regularly wrote for columns on the Phillies and Major League Baseball for The Philadelphia Bulletin and the Philadelphia Daily News.

According to Ashburn's mother, he planned to retire from broadcasting at the end of the 1997 season. On September 9, 1997, in New York City, after broadcasting the Phillies-Mets game at Shea Stadium, Ashburn suffered a heart attack and died. A large crowd of fans paid tribute to him, passing by his casket in Memorial Hall, located in Philadelphia's Fairmount Park. He is interred in the suburban Gladwyne Methodist Church Cemetery, Montgomery County, Pennsylvania.

Awards and honors

Ashburn was elected to the Baseball Hall of Fame by the Hall's Veterans Committee in 1995 after a long fan campaign to induct him, which included bumper stickers that read, "Richie Ashburn: Why The Hall Not?" He accompanied Phillies great Mike Schmidt, who was inducted in the same ceremony. Over 25,000 fans, mostly from Philadelphia, traveled to Cooperstown for the ceremony.

Ashburn was inducted into The Broadcast Pioneers of Philadelphia Hall of Fame in 1997.

Ashburn was posthumously inducted into the inaugural class of the Philadelphia Sports Hall of Fame in 2004.

Each year the Phillies present the Richie Ashburn Special Achievement Award to "a member of the organization who has demonstrated loyalty, dedication and passion for the game."

The center-field entertainment area at the Phillies current stadium, Citizens Bank Park, was named Ashburn Alley in his honor after numerous fans urged the Phillies to name their new stadium after Ashburn. Ashburn's 47 seasons of service to the Phillies organization was second in length in Philadelphia baseball history only to Connie Mack, who was so honored by the renaming of Shibe Park in 1953.

At Citizens Bank Park, the Phillies' radio-broadcast booth is named "The Richie 'Whitey' Ashburn Broadcast Booth". It is directly next to the TV-broadcast booth, which was renamed "The Harry Kalas Broadcast Booth" after Kalas's death in 2009.

Miscellaneous

Ashburn was well known for his dry humor as a broadcaster. On one occasion, he was talking to Harry Kalas about his superstitions during his playing days. He said that he once had a habit of keeping a successful baseball bat in bed with him between games, not trusting the clubhouse crew to give him the same bat the next day.  Ashburn told Kalas that he had "slept with a lot of old bats" in his day.

When calling late innings, Ashburn would occasionally ask on-air if the staff of Celebre's Pizza, a nearby pizzeria in South Philly, was listening to the radio.  Pizza would then arrive at the radio booth 15–20 minutes later.  The Phillies requested that Ashburn discontinue the practice, as Celebre's was not a Phillies sponsor, and it was considered free advertising.

Ashburn was allowed to make on-air birthday and anniversary wishes during Phillies games.  To circumvent the Phillies' request, he started to say "I'd like to send out a special birthday wish to the Celebre's twins – Plain & Pepperoni!" Harry Kalas was heard on radio in 2007 making a similar wish.

Rubén Amaro Jr., former general manager of the Phillies and son of former Phillies shortstop and coach Rubén Amaro Sr., co-founded the Richie Ashburn Foundation, which provides free baseball camp for 1,100 underprivileged children in the Delaware Valley and awards grants to area schools and colleges.

Ted Williams gave Ashburn the nickname "Putt-Putt" because he "ran so fast you would think he had twin motors in his pants".  The origin of the nickname also has been attributed to Stan Musial.

The book, Richie Ashburn: Why The Hall Not?, is about Richie's journey to the Baseball Hall of Fame.

See also
 List of Major League Baseball career hits leaders
 List of Major League Baseball career triples leaders
 List of Major League Baseball career runs scored leaders
 List of Major League Baseball career stolen bases leaders
 List of Major League Baseball batting champions
 List of Major League Baseball annual stolen base leaders
 List of Major League Baseball annual triples leaders
 List of Philadelphia Phillies team records
 Major League Baseball consecutive games played streaks

References

External links

Richie Ashburn at SABR (Baseball BioProject)
Richie Ashburn at Baseball Almanac
Richie Ashburn at Baseball Gauge
Richie Ashburn at Baseballbiography.com
Richie Ashburn at Ultimate Mets Database
Richie Ashburn at The Deadball Era
 Richie Ashburn Baseball Foundation
 "Richie Ashburn: Why The Hall Not" book site
Richie Ashburn at Broadcast Pioneers of Philadelphia Hall of Fame (1997, no bio available)

1927 births
1997 deaths
Baseball players from Nebraska
Burials in Pennsylvania
Chicago Cubs players
Major League Baseball broadcasters
Major League Baseball center fielders
Major League Baseball players with retired numbers
National Baseball Hall of Fame inductees
National League All-Stars
National League batting champions
National League stolen base champions
New York Mets players
People from Tilden, Nebraska
Philadelphia Phillies announcers
Philadelphia Phillies players
Utica Blue Sox players